East Dulwich Comedy was a British comedy club that started above the East Dulwich Tavern in East Dulwich in November 1988.
It has also been located at the Magdala Tavern, 21 Lordship Lane, Southwark, and moved to the Hobgoblin pub in Forest Hill until the club's closure in 2015.

Over the years, the club played host to many well known comedians including Stephen Frost, Eddie Izzard, Jo Brand, Mark Lamarr, Bill Bailey, Mark Thomas, Jenny Eclair, Alan Davies, Harry Hill, Andy Parsons, Graham Norton and Norman Lovett.

References

External links
 

1988 establishments in England
Comedy clubs in the United Kingdom
Dulwich
2015 disestablishments in England
Defunct entertainment venues